Globule may refer to:

 Bok globule, dark clouds of dense cosmic dust
 Drop (liquid), small column of liquid
 Antibubbles of liquid on top of a surface of liquid
 Globule (CDN), content delivery network
 Molten globule, protein state